Torn Between Two Lovers is a 1979 American TV movie.

Premise
A married housewife, Diane, falls in love with another man, an architect.

Cast
Lee Remick as Diane
George Peppard
Joseph Bologna

Production
It was shot in Toronto in January 1979.

Reception
The New York Times called it "rather ordinary" with "slick production".

References

External links
 
Torn Between Two Lovers at BFI
Torn Between Two Lovers at Letterbox DVD

1979 television films
1979 films
American television films